Rolando Laserie (born August 27, 1923, died November 22, 1998) was a Cuban singer, vocalist, actor and percussionist. He started his career as a percussionist with bands in his hometown, In 1998, The New York Times and The Washington Post magazine described him as one of the great Cuban singers of all time and as one of the greatest vocalists in Cuban music.

Biography 
Rolando Laserie was born in Santa Clara, Cuba. He started his musical career at a young age as a percussionist with musical bands in his hometown. Prior that, he moved to the capital of Cuba, Havana, where he performed with numerous musical groups including Benny More's band, Banda Gigante.

Laserie later transitioned into singing and appeared with Tony Álvarez and Olga Chorens as a singing trio which was assisted by Cuban pianist, Bebo Valdés radio orchestra. In 1960 when Fidel Castro took power, Laserie frequently moved from city to city with his wife, including Mexico, Venezuela Argentina, New York City and Florida where he would eventually relocate and settle. Laserie became an American citizen, he recorded over 30 studio albums before his death in 1998. He also appeared alongside Israel López Valdés for a reunion concert in 1996

Death 
Laserie died of cardiac disease in Healthsouth Doctor's Hospital in Coral Gables, Florida, United States, and was buried at the Miami Memorial Park Cemetery.

References

External links 

 Rolando Laserie at University of Miami Libraries
 Rolando Laserie at AllMusic
 

1923 births
1998 deaths
Cuban musicians
Latin musicians by genre
Jazz musicians
People from Santa Clara, Cuba